Brayden Thomas (born March 20, 1998) is a professional American football outside linebacker who is a free agent. He played college football for the University of Mary, Minnesota State, and North Dakota State.

Early life and high school
Thomas grew up in Bismarck, North Dakota and attended Bismarck High School.

College career
Thomas began his college football career at the University of Mary. He played one season for the Marauders before transferring to Minnesota State-Mankato. Thomas was named second team All-Northern Sun Intercollegiate Conference (NSIC) as a junior after he recorded 21 tackles for loss and 11.5 sacks. His senior was canceled due to COVID-19. After his senior season, Thomas transferred to North Dakota State (NDSU) as a graduate transfer. He decided to utilize the extra year of eligibility granted to college athletes who played in the 2020 season due to the coronavirus pandemic and return to NDSU for a sixth season. In the final season of his college career, Thomas had nine sacks and 14.5 tackles for loss and was named first-team All-Missouri Valley Football Conference.

Professional career
Thomas was signed by the Los Angeles Rams as an undrafted free agent on April 30, 2022.  He was waived during final roster cuts on August 30, 2022, but was signed to the team's practice squad the next day. Thomas was elevated to the active roster on December, 2022, for the team's Week 16 game against the Denver Broncos and made his NFL debut in the game. He signed a reserve/futures contract on January 9, 2023.

On March 10, 2023, Thomas was waived by the Los Angeles Rams.

References

External links
 Mary Marauders bio
 Minnesota State Mavericks bio
 North Dakota State Bison bio
 Los Angeles Rams bio

Living people
American football offensive tackles
Players of American football from North Dakota
North Dakota State Bison football players
Minnesota State Mavericks football players
Mary Marauders football players
1998 births
Minnesota State University, Mankato alumni